al-Zuhri is an Arabic name which may refer to:

Ibn Shihab al-Zuhri, 8th-century hadith scholar and jurist
Ahmad ibn Abi Bakr al-Zuhri (767–856), 9th-century Maliki jurist
Muhammad ibn Abi Bakr al-Zuhri, 12th-century Andalusian geographer

See also
Banu Zuhrah, Arab tribe whose members carry the name al-Zuhri